The 2021–22 season is Muangkan United's 1st season in Thai League 2 after promoted from Thai League 3 for the first time in the club's history in 2021. In this season, Muangkan United participates in 3 competitions which consisted of the Thai League 2, FA Cup, and League Cup.

The season was supposed to start on 31 July 2021 and concluded on 30 April 2022. However, due to the current situation of the COVID-19 pandemic in Thailand is still severe, FA Thailand decided to postpone the season to start on 14 August 2021 instead. However, as it stands on 23 July 2021, the COVID-19's situation is getting even worse. Therefore, FA Thailand decided to postpone the opening day for the second time to start on 3 September 2021.

Squad

Transfer

Pre-season transfer

In

Loan In

Out

Loan Out

Mid-season transfer

In

Loan In

Out

Loan Out

Competitions

Overview

Thai League 2

League table

Results summary

Results by matchday

Matches

Thai FA Cup

Thai League Cup

Team statistics

Appearances and goals

Overall summary

Season summary

Notes

References 

MKU
2021-22